{{Infobox television
| image              =
| caption            = 
| genre              = 
| writer             = Pradeep Panicker
| director           = Praveen Kadakkavoor
| creative_director  = 
| starring           = 
| narrated           = 
| opentheme          = 
| endtheme           = 
| composer           = 
| country            = India
| language           = Malayalam
| num_seasons        = 4
| num_episodes       = 1450
| executive_producer = 
| producer           = 
| editor             = Ajith Dev Pothencode
| location           = Kerala
| cinematography     = Hemachandran  B.Kumar
| camera             = Multi-camera
| runtime            = 22 minutes
| company            = 
| distributor        = 
| channel            = Asianet
| picture_format     = 1080i (HDTV)
| audio_format       = 
| first_aired        = 
| last_aired         = 
| related            = Karthika DeepamMuddulakshmiBharathi KannammaRang Majha VeglaKartik PurnimaAnurager Chhowa| image_alt          = 
| creator            = 
| list_episodes      = 
| network            = 
| released           = 
| native_name        = കറുത്തമുത്ത് 
}}Karuthamuthu was a 2014 Indian television Malayalam language series, which premiered on 20 October 2014 on Asianet channel. It is the second longest running television soap opera in Malayalam television completing successful telecasting for five years with 1,450 episodes and four seasons.

Karuthamuthu started off with story of a black-skinned lady, her life tribulations and story with Kishor Satya and Premi Viswanath in the leading cast. Kishor Satya, 
Renu Soundar and Akshara Kishor played the lead role of season 2 which portrays on the story of Balamol (the daughter of Dr. Balachandran and Karthika). Darshana Das and Rini Raj plays the lead role in Season 3 which dealt the trials and tribulations of Balamol and Podimol (the daughter of Jayachandran and Kanya). Pradeep Chandran as Abhiram IPS. Finally, Season 4 portrayed the story of Muthu'' (Abhiram-Bala's daughter) played by Baby Kezhiya retaining the same cast of previous season.

The show had highest TRP rating in the beginning and towards the last season rating decrease which force the channel to stop the serial. It is the first Malayalam show to be remade in six languages (Telugu, Kannada, Hindi, Bengali,Marathi and Tamil). The show has been retelecast in Asianet Plus in the noon slot of 1.00PM IST since 15 June 2020, but was later cancelled due to low ratings.

Plot

Season 1

Karthika, a dark-skinned girl, is treated badly by her fair-skinned sister. She marries Balachandran but has to fight societal and family pressures in order to lead a happy married life.

Season 2

Nathan finds Karthu and her daughter, Balachandrika roaming around in streets of Tamil Nadu and takes them back but Karthu is physically ill and admits her in a hospital without letting others know about her. The series takes a twist with Bala's arrival to Kaipamangalam. Everyone refuses her except Balan. Later, Balachandran and family learn that Balamol is his own daughter at the same time Karthu's presence on the other hand Mareena and Balan's marriage was fixed, cruel Mareena learns that Balan is making a fool of her and plans to kill him. Mareena and Shekharan get to know that Karthu and her daughter is alive. They plan to kill them without anyone knowing about it. After an accident, Karthu loses her memory and is taken care by Dr. Arun. In an attempt to kill Balan unfortunately Jayan is killed by Mareena and Kanya becomes mentally unstable and later she gives birth to a baby girl. Balan suffers from cancer and leaves to Germany. Finally after series of events Kanya kills Mareena and is imprisoned. Podimol cared for by Karthu who remembers her past and is back at Kaipamangalam. Balan, Karthu and Bala reunite. Kunjusekharan becomes worried about Podimol as a fake astrologer predicts that Bala and Podimol cannot survive together at a place. Upon Kanya's release, Shekharan misleads her and takes her and Podimol away to live with him and his mother.

Season 3

Balachandrika becomes the sub collector of the city and story goes around her life. Now the story turn to show the relationship between Balamol and Podimol. Balamol being a collector catches Podimol's wrongdoings and forms an instant dislike towards her, despite Bala's soft heart. Bala and Abhiram are in love with each other from quite a long time, but Podimol is attracted towards Abhiram, too. Bala secretly marries Abhiram, without Podimol's knowledge. Later Bala's family reveals that Podimol is Bala's cousin and Bala regrets the marriage, and starts taking care of her, even though Podimol doesn't know that Bala is married to Abhiram. Aromal, Sadu's son tries to convey the message to Gayathri that Bala is already married to her love. Gayathri rejects this idea saying that her blood, her sister won't let her fail. On the other hand, Bala and Abhiram spend time secretly with each other in the fear of Gayathri learning about their marriage. Meanwhile, Bala conceives and Gayathri learns of it later. Suicidal, she's saved by Bala. After treatment under Dr. Arun, she starts afresh and gets married to Ganesh, a gentleman with a strict mother. The family gets to know of Balan's death in Germany and is heartbroken. Bala does all the rituals of her father who left for his heavenly abode. She faints and gets admitted in the hospital where she experiences severe pains. Her condition becomes critical when she is pushed from the stretcher by Stephen, a hitman hired by Shekharan. However, she survives the attack. Bala and Abhiram are blessed with a baby girl. The family rejoices. Meanwhile, Gayathri faces ill treatment from her mother-in-law who constantly berates her. However, her husband is supportive.

Bala gets into an accident caused by Stephen due to which she loses her kid. The kid however turns out to be alive and is taken in by a church and is named Muthu.

Season 4
It portrayed the story of Muthu, the daughter of Abhiram and Bala.

Cast

Seasons 1 and 2 (2014 – 2017)
 Kishor Satya as Dr. Balachandran
 Premi Viswanath / Renu Soundar as Karthika Balachandran: Balachandran's wife. Balachandrika's mother. Kanya's elder stepsister and sister-in-law. Mallika's daughter. Nathan and Jagadhamba's daughter-in-law. Abhiram's mother-in-law. 
 Archana Suseelan as Mareena (Main Antagonist)
 Akshara Kishor as Balachandrika/Bala mol (200-775 episodes)
 Richard N. J. as Jayachandran
 Saranya Sasi as Kanya (1 to 115 episodes)
 Lekshmi Priya replaced Saranya Sasi as Kanya (116 to 774 episodes)
 Santhosh Kurup as Ret Prof. Nathan
 Giridhar as Sreekanth
 Srihari as Kunju Shekharan
 Sreelatha Namboothiri as Shekharan's mother
 Dr. Sharmila as Jagadhamba
 Rajani Murali as Nandini
 Shobha Mohan as Arundhathi
 Devendranath as Dr. Arun
 Thara Kalyan as Mallika
 Akhil Nair as Aromal
 Jayakumar Parameswaran Pillai as Sadanam Sadu
 Arun Mohan as Stephen
 Shiju as Shankar Das
 Lishoy as Dr. Fernandus
 Balachandran Chullikkadu as Dr. Perumal
 Bindu Murali as Lakshmi Dathan
 Sree Padma as Anjana
 Pratheeksha G Pradeep as Raveena
 T.S.Raju as Abhi's ammavan
 Sarath Swamy as Amal
 Anand Narayan as Prem
 Cherthala Lalitha as Sadu's mother / Nathan's sister
 Lalitha as Mallika
 Sree Lakshmi as Anjana
 Illikettu Namboothiri as Sathyaseelan

Seasons 3 and 4 (2017 – 2019)
Darshana Das as Gayathri Ganeshan (Podimol)
Rini Raj as Balachandrika Abhiram IAS 

Pradeep Chandran as Commissioner Abhiram IPS
Baby Kezhiya as Muthu
Shalu Menon as Kanya Jayan

Kiran Iyer as Ganeshan
Santhosh Kurup as Ret Prof. Nathan
Giridhar as Sreekanth
Srihari as Kunju Shekharan
Sreelatha Namboothiri as Shekharan's mother
Dr. Sharmila as Jagadhamba
Soniya Baiju Kottarakkara as Kaipatoor Kanaka
Anoop Sivasenan as Sukeshan
Niya as Karthika Balachandran
Soorya Praveen as Ganga Sukeshan
Bindu Ramakrishnan as Sukeshan's mother
Babu Annur as Sukesan's father

Awards
8th ASIANET TELEVISION AWARDS 2015

 Best Serial - Karuthamuthu
 Best Actor - Kishor Satya
 Best Debut Male - Richard
 Best Debut Female - Premi Vishwanth
 Best Debut Female (special jury) - Lekshmipriya
 Best Actor in a Negative role (special jury) - Srihari
 Best Actress in a Negative role (special jury) - Archana Suseelan
 Best Director - Praveen Kadakkavoor
 Best Screenplay - Pradeep Panicker
 Best Character Actor - Santosh Kurup
 Best Character Actress (special jury) - Dr.Sharmila
 Best Actor in a Humorous role (special jury) - Jayakumar

9th ASIANET TELEVISION AWARDS 2016

 Most Popular Serial - Karuthamuthu
 Life Time Achievement award - Sreelatha Namboothiri
 Best Actor - Kishor Satya
 Best Child actor - Akshara Kishor
 Best Director - Praveen Kadakkavoor
 Best Screenplay - Pradeep Panicker
 Best Character actor - Santosh Kurup
 Best Character actor (Special Jury) - Giridhar
 Best Character actress -Thara Kalyan
 Best Actress in a Negative role - Archana Suseelan
 Most Popular Actress (Special Jury) - Lekshmipriya
 Best Script - Pradeep Panicker
 Best Actor in a Humorous role - Jayakumar

10th ASIANET TELEVISION AWARDS 2017

 Best Director - Praveen Kadakkavoor
 Best Actress in a Negative role - Archana Suseelan
 Best Audiography - Sreejith Vj

11th ASIANET TELEVISION AWARDS 2018

 Most Popular Actress - Darshana Das
 Best Video Grapher - B. Kumar
 Best Character actor - Santosh Kurup

Adaptations

References

External links
 

Indian television series
Indian television soap operas
Serial drama television series
2014 Indian television series debuts
Malayalam-language television shows
Indian drama television series
Asianet (TV channel) original programming